The 1981 Amílcar Cabral Cup was held in Bamako, Mali.

Group stage

Group A

Walkover. Awarded 1-0 to Mauritania

Group B

Knockout stage

Semi-finals

Fifth place match

Third place match

Final

References
RSSSF archives

Amílcar Cabral Cup